Coonamble is a town on the central-western plains of New South Wales, Australia. It lies on the Castlereagh Highway north-west of Gilgandra.  At the 2016 census, Coonamble had a population of 2,750. It is the regional hub for wheat growing and sheep and wool. The name for the town is taken from the Gamilaraay word guna (faeces) and -bil (having much).

Brigidine nuns from Ireland established a school in 1883. Their architecturally distinguished convent was dismantled in 1990 and transported  to Pokolbin, where it now houses The Convent resort.

Although Coonamble had been a major sheep industry region in the 1980s to 2000, there has recently been an increasing interest in cattle rearing. Most recently Coonamble has gained media coverage due to their mass floods over Christmas 2009.

Bushrangers
Johnny Dunn the bushranger and last of the Ben Hall gang was captured near Coonamble after a gunbattle with police at Christmas 1865.

Population
 In the 2016 Census, there were 2,750 people in Coonamble.
 Aboriginal and Torres Strait Islander people made up 34.2% of the population.
 80.0% of people were born in Australia and  83.0% of people only spoke English at home.
 The most common responses for religion were Anglican 34.3% and Catholic 28.9%.

Schools and Churches
Coonamble has three schools: Coonamble Public School, St Brigids Catholic School and Coonamble High School.

It has a Catholic and an Anglican church.

Rodeo
Coonamble hosts an annual rodeo that is attended by around 1,000 competitors and 4,000 spectators.

Radio station
Coonamble has its own local radio station, 2MTM 91.9FM, which has a wide variety of music from country to modern.

Outback Radio 2WEB broadcasts to the area on 91.1FM.

Sports
The Coonamble Bears play in the Castlereagh Cup Rugby League competition. The Coonamble Rams play in the  Western Plains Rugby Union competition.

Climate
Coonamble has a hot semi-arid climate (BSh) with long hot summers and short cool winters, with mild, albeit erratic, rainfall spread through the months.

Heritage listings
Coonamble has a number of heritage-listed sites, including:
 Dubbo–Coonamble railway: Coonamble railway station

Notable people 
 Ron Boden, rugby league player
 Alex Cullen, journalist
 Ned Hanigan, rugby player
 Lancelot Hansen, rugby league player
 Eddie Murray, rugby league player, notable Aboriginal death in custody
 Mary Quirk, politician
 Jesse Ramien, rugby league player
 Thomas Tyrrell, trade unionist and politician
 Adriano Zumbo, pâtissier and chef

See also

 Coonamble railway
 Coonamble airport

References

External links 

 Coonamble Shire Council
 Coonamble on the Castlereagh
 The Sydney Morning Herald Travel: Coonamble (February 8, 2004)
 ABC Radio National: Coonamble Open For Business (15 March 2003)
 Aussie Towns Coonamble NSW

Towns in New South Wales
Towns in the Central West (New South Wales)